C. radians may refer to:
 Cellana radians, the golden limpet, a marine gastropod species found in seas around New Zealand and Australia
 Cerastium radians, a synonym for Cerastium cerastoides, a flowering plant species found in Mountain regions of Europe
 Coprinellus radians, a mushroom species

See also 
 Radians (disambiguation)